James de Saumarez may refer to:

 James Saumarez, 1st Baron de Saumarez (1757–1836), British Royal Navy admiral
 James Saumarez, 2nd Baron de Saumarez  (1789–1863), Baron de Saumarez
 James Saumarez, 4th Baron de Saumarez (1843–1937), British diplomat and peer
 James Saumarez, 5th Baron de Saumarez (1889–1969), Baron de Saumarez
 James Saumarez, 6th Baron de Saumarez (1924–1991), Baron de Saumarez